Perri may refer to:
Perri (novel) or The Youth of a Squirrel, a 1938 novel by Felix Salten
 Perri (film), a 1957 Disney film
Perri (name), a surname and given name
 Perri (surname)

See also
 Peri (disambiguation)
 Perry (disambiguation)
 Porri (disambiguation)